Springs Station was a fort, established in 1780 in the area of Beal's Branch of Beargrass Creek in what is now Louisville, Kentucky. It was established at the time of the founding of Louisville as part of the settlement's defensive network of six forts, to protect settlers from attack by the Indians who were allied with the British.

Springs Station was built by a family named Steele.  They came to Kentucky from Pennsylvania on a flatboat in 1780. Richard and Martha Steele lived at Spring Station and had thirteen children.  Richard had been granted land as payment for military service.  Mrs. Steele became a pioneer heroine when she saved her wounded husband after an Indian attack at Springs Station. Tradition has it that she left the safety of Floyd's Station and traveled at night with a small child in the vicinity of Indian camps to aid her husband at Springs Station.

See also
Corn Island (Kentucky)
Fort Nelson (Kentucky)
Fort-on-Shore
Fort William (Kentucky)
Floyd's Station (Kentucky)
Low Dutch Station
Bryan's Station
Station (frontier defensive structure)

References

Former buildings and structures in Louisville, Kentucky
Nelson
History of Louisville, Kentucky
Pre-statehood history of Kentucky